was a town located in Nakauonuma District, Niigata Prefecture, Japan.

As of 2003, the town had an estimated population of 7,829 and a density of 106.44 persons per km2. The total area was 73.55 km2.

On April 1, 2005, Kawanishi, along with the towns of Matsudai and Matsunoyama (both from Higashikubiki District), and the village of Nakasato (also from Nakauonuma District), was merged into the expanded city of Tōkamachi.

Transportation

Highway
 
 

Dissolved municipalities of Niigata Prefecture
Tōkamachi, Niigata